Bachia bicolor, the two-colored bachia, is a species of lizard in the family Gymnophthalmidae. It is found in   Venezuela and Colombia.

References

Bachia
Reptiles described in 1896
Reptiles of Peru
Endemic fauna of Peru
Taxa named by Charles Earle Burt
Taxa named by May Danheim Burt